The  is an annual Nippon Professional Baseball (NPB) award given to two outstanding players, one each for the Central League (CL) and Pacific League (PL).

Each league's award is voted on by national baseball writers. Each voter selects three players: a first-place selection is given five points, a second-place selection three points, and a third-place selection one point. The award goes to the player who receives the most overall points. The winners are announced every year in November during Nippon Professional Baseball's awards ceremony called NBP Awards.

The first recipient of the award was Eiji Sawamura. The most recent winners, in 2020, are Tomoyuki Sugano, from the Central League, and Yuki Yanagita, from the Pacific League. In 1940, Victor Starffin became the first player to win the award consecutively and multiple times. Eiji Sawamura and Kazuhisa Inao are the youngest players to receive the awards in 1937 and 1957, respectively, at the ages of 20. In 1988, Hiromitsu Kadota became the oldest player to receive the award at the age of 40.

Key

Winners

Japanese Baseball League (1937–1949)

Nippon Professional Baseball (1950–present)

Central League

Pacific League

Multiple winners
There have been 22 players who have won the award multiple times. Sadaharu Oh currently holds the record for the most awards won, with nine. Hisashi Yamada (1976–1978) and Ichiro Suzuki (1994–1996) share the record for the most consecutive awards won. Yutaka Enatsu and Michihiro Ogasawara are the only players to have won the award in both the Central League and Pacific League. Alex Ramírez is the only non-Japanese player receive the award multiple times after the formation of two league system.

Notes
The save statistic was not formally recorded in the NPB until the 1974 season.
 The 1945 Japanese Baseball League was cancelled due to World War II.
 After 1958, Kazuto Yamamoto became known as Kazuto Tsuruoka.
 Tetsuharu Kawakami received his first MVP award in 1941, nine years before the formation of Nippon Professional Baseball.

See also
Nippon Professional Baseball#Awards
Baseball awards#Japan
List of Nippon Professional Baseball earned run average champions
Japan Professional Sports Grand Prize
Athlete of the Year
Most valuable player
Player of the year award

Notes
General

Specific

References

Nippon Professional Baseball trophies and awards
Japan
Japan